The Church of the Holy Cross is a Roman Catholic house of worship in Warsaw, Poland. Located on Krakowskie Przedmieście opposite the main Warsaw University campus, it is one of the most notable Baroque churches in Poland's capital.

The Holy Cross Church is currently administered by the Missionary Friars of Vincent de Paul.

History 
As early as the 15th century, a small wooden chapel of the Holy Cross had been erected here. In 1526 the  chapel was demolished, and a newer church was erected. Refurbished and extended by Paweł Zembrzuski in 1615, the church was too small to fill the needs of the growing city. Initially located well outside the city limits, by the 17th century it had become one of the main churches in the southern suburb (przedmieście) of the city that had in 1596 become Poland's capital.

In 1653 Queen Marie Louise Gonzaga gave the church to the French order of Missionary Friars of Vincent de Paul. However, three years later Warsaw was captured by Swedish armies during the Deluge. Pillaged, the church was found to be damaged beyond repair. During the reign of King John III Sobieski the church's remnants were demolished, and it was decided to erect a new shrine. In the 18th century this became the origin of the gorzkie żale tradition.

The main building was constructed between 1679 and 1696. Its main designer was Józef Szymon Bellotti, the royal architect at the Royal Court of Poland. It was financed by abbot Kazimierz Szczuka and the Primate of Poland Michał Stefan Radziejowski. The façade was relatively modest and reminded of Renaissance facades of the nearby churches. The two towers surrounding the façade were initially square-cut. Between 1725 and 1737 two late Baroque headpieces by Józef Fontana. The façade itself was refurbished by Fontana's son, Jakub (in 1756) and ornamented with sculptures by Jan Jerzy Plersch.

From 1765 the church was one of the most attended by Polish King Stanisław II Augustus. It was also there that the King established the Order of St. Stanisław and bestowed it upon loyal servants annually on May 8. On May 3, 1792, the Polish Diet gathered there on the first anniversary of the May 3rd Constitution. During the Warsaw Uprising of 1794, the stairs leading to the main entrance were destroyed and had to be replaced with new ones designed by Chrystian Piotr Aigner.

During the Partitions, the church gained much importance, especially after the 1861 demonstration held before it, which was brutally put down by Russian Cossack troops — sparking the January 1863 Uprising.

On Christmas Day 1881, an outbreak of panic following a false alarm of fire in the crowded church caused the stampede deaths of twenty-nine persons. Jews were blamed for starting the panic, and the Warsaw pogrom of 1881 ensued.

In the late 19th century the church interior was slightly refurbished, and in 1882 an urn containing the heart of Frédéric Chopin was immured in a pillar. Some decades later, a similar urn was added with the heart of Władysław Reymont. In 1889 the external staircase leading to the main entrance was reconstructed, and a sculpture of Christ Bearing His Cross by Pius Weloński was added. The sculpture bears the inscription, Sursum Corda ("Lift Up Your Hearts"), signifying the Poles' endurance under the Russian partition. In addition to urns containing the hearts of some of Poland's most renowned artists, there are several epitaphs to other notable Poles of the late 19th and early 20th centuries, including Juliusz Słowacki, Józef Ignacy Kraszewski, Bolesław Prus, and Władysław Sikorski.

During the 1944 Warsaw Uprising, the church was severely damaged. On 6 September 1944, when the Germans detonated two large Goliath tracked mines in the church (they usually carried 75–100 kg of high explosives) the facade was destroyed, together with many Baroque furnishings, the vaulting, the high altar, and side altars. Afterward the church was blown up by the Germans in January 1945.

Between 1945 and 1953, the church was rebuilt in a simplified architectural form by B. Zborowski. The interior was reconstructed without the Baroque polychromes and frescos. The main altar was reconstructed between 1960 and 1972.

Traditionally, during the Chopin International Piano Competition on 17 October – the day of Fryderyk Chopin's death – a solemn mass is celebrated in the church, during which Wolfgang Amadeus Mozart's Requiem is performed in accordance with the wishes of the composer.

Burials 
Frédéric François Chopin (1810-1849): His heart is interred in the church. His body is buried in Père Lachaise Cemetery, Paris.

Trivia 
 The Holy Cross Church and its gardens (now non-existent and occupied by the building of the Finance Ministry) gave their name to Świętokrzyska Street, one of the most notable streets in central Warsaw.
 Following the signing of the Gdańsk Accords between Solidarity and the communist government of the People's Republic of Poland in 1980, it was decided that a mass be transmitted countrywide via state-controlled radio. Since then, the mass has been recorded weekly at the church for transmission.

Images

Historical

Present day

See also

 Visitationist Church
 St. Casimir's Church
 St. Florian's Cathedral

External links
VIRTUAL TOUR

Notes and references

General:
 
 

Roman Catholic churches completed in 1696
17th-century Roman Catholic church buildings in Poland
Baroque church buildings in Poland
Roman Catholic churches in Warsaw
Basilica churches in Poland
Buildings and structures in Warsaw
Rebuilt buildings and structures in Poland
1696 establishments in the Polish–Lithuanian Commonwealth
Nazi war crimes in Poland